The Tapura Amui No Raromatai is a political party in French Polynesia.
At the last legislative elections on May 23, 2004, and by-elections on February 13, 2005, the party was part of the Union for the Democracy (Union pour la Démocratie), that won 27 out of 57 seats.

See also
List of political parties in French Polynesia
Elections in French Polynesia
Assembly of French Polynesia
Politics of French Polynesia

Political parties in French Polynesia